Anthony Christopher Yu (October 6, 1938 – May 12, 2015) was an American literary theorist, sinologist, and theologian. He was a scholar of literature and religion, both East Asian and Western; and was the Carl Darling Buck Distinguished Service Professor Emeritus in the Humanities and Professor Emeritus of Religion and Literature in the Chicago Divinity School; as well as a member of the Departments of Comparative Literature, East Asian Languages and Civilizations, and English Language and Literature, and the Committee on Social Thought at the University of Chicago. Yu has published widely in the fields of religion and comparative literature and is perhaps best known for his four-volume translation of one of China's Four Great Classical Novels Journey to the West into English.

Biography
Yu was born in Hong Kong on October 6, 1938. His middle initial "C" was only a legal formality, though Yu later took the middle name Christopher. His father, Pak Chuen Yu, a general in the Chinese Nationalist Army, and his mother Norma Sau Chan, then went to the mainland to escape the Japanese invasion. There, starting at the age of four, Yu learned classical Chinese from his grandfather, who would tell him stories from Journey to the West and draw Chinese characters in the sand for him to learn. After the war he went with his parents to Taiwan. He went to the United States, where he graduated from Houghton College, then took a bachelor’s degree in theology at Fuller Theological Seminary (S.T.B) and the University of Chicago (Ph.D). Among his honors and awards are elected membership in the American Council of Learned Societies and Academia Sinica, as well as the Guggenheim Fellowship and Mellon Foundation grant.

He died of heart failure in 2015.

Works
 

 
 
 --- coedited (with Mary Gerhart) Morphologies of Faith: Essays in Religion and Culture in Honor of Nathan A. Scott, Jr.

References

Further reading

 Eric Jozef Ziolkowski, ed. Literature, Religion, and East/West Comparison: Essays in Honor of Anthony C. Yu (Newark: University of Delaware Press, 2005). .

1938 births
2015 deaths
20th-century American historians
20th-century American theologians
21st-century American historians
21st-century American theologians
American literary theorists
American sinologists
Fuller Theological Seminary alumni
Hong Kong emigrants to the United States
Houghton University alumni
Journey to the West
Members of Academia Sinica
University of Chicago alumni
University of Chicago faculty